Human betaherpesvirus 6A (HHV-6A) is a species of virus in the genus Roseolovirus, subfamily Betaherpesvirinae, family Herpesviridae, and order Herpesvirales.

Taxonomy 
In 1992 the two variants were recognised within Human herpesvirus 6 on the basis of differing restriction endonuclease cleavages, monoclonal antibody reactions, and growth patterns. In 2012 these two variants were officially recognised as distinct species by the International Committee on Taxonomy of Viruses and named Human betaherpesvirus 6A and Human betaherpesvirus 6B. Despite now being recognised as paraphyletic, the name Human herpesvirus 6 still sees usage in clinical contexts.

Pathology 

Human betaherpesvirus 6A affects humans and includes several adult-derived strains. Its disease spectrum is not well defined, although it is thought by some to be more neurovirulent than Human betaherpesvirus 6B.

References 

Betaherpesvirinae